Mishka Henner (born 8 June 1976) is a Belgian artist living and working in Manchester, England. His work has featured in several surveys of contemporary artists working with photography in the internet age. He has been described by some as a modern-day Duchamp for his appropriation of image-rich technologies including Google Earth, Google Street View, and YouTube, and for his adoption of print-on-demand as a means to bypass traditional publishing models.

Education and early career
Henner studied Sociology at Loughborough University (1994–1997) and at Goldsmiths College (1997–1998). On leaving Goldsmiths, he remained in London for a number of years and in 2003 visited "Cruel and Tender" at Tate Modern, a survey of documentary photography, which he described as life-changing.

Between 2004 and 2010, he worked with long-time collaborator Liz Lock, a photographer from Toronto, Canada, on documentary projects in and around London and the North West of England and on portrait and feature commissions for a number of British broadsheets including The Independent and Financial Times. In 2008, Lock and Henner joined Panos Pictures (part of the Panos Institute) becoming Profile photographers for the agency in 2010. They left the agency in the summer of 2012.

Key works
Between 2010 and 2015, Henner's work was characterized by an engagement with the nature of photography in the post-Internet age. Many of his works resulted in print-on-demand books, films and installations that featured in large-scale museum surveys in France, Canada, and the US. In the jury report of the Kleine Hans award of 2012, Hans Aarsman, Hans Eijkelboom, Hans van de Meer, Hans Wolf and Hans Samson described Henner's work in the following manner:

A new approach to photography is seeing the light - photographers without cameras. The need to press the shutter is replaced by a direct interest in images - not necessarily in making images. These photographers make books with photographs they find and sometimes they mix them with photographs they take. In this rising flock Mishka Henner is the trailblazer.

Writing in a New York Times feature on the artist in 2015, the author and critic Philip Gefter wrote, "He is one of a growing number of artists making savvy use of the surveillance capabilities of satellite imaging and Google Street View in work that reflects the way the Internet age has altered our visual experience." In the same article, the Museum of Modern Art's Chief Curator of Photography Quentin Bajac is quoted as saying, "His work is at the crossroads of many different genres or practices [...] part of a strategy of neo-appropriation that you find in contemporary photography today with the Internet.”

Photography Is
In February 2010, Henner released Photography Is, presenting “more than 3,000 phrases that define one of the most democratic and ubiquitous of all art forms. Mirroring the ambiguous and untrustworthy nature of photographs themselves, each phrase in this book has been torn from the context in which it originally appeared. The result is contradictory and chaotic, frustrating and insightful. In short, it is photography, without photographs.”.

Reviewing the work in Fotokritik in March 2010, the German artist Joachim Schmid wrote, “The sheer volume and diversity of quotes are a great reflection of photography itself: sometimes intelligent, sometimes stupid, sometimes simple, sometimes complicated, serious, funny, poetic, romantic – as diverse, different and contradictory as the people who utter them.".

In 2015, an installation of Photography Is featured in the Qu'est-ce que la photographie (What is photography?) exhibition curated by Clément Chéroux and Karolina Ziebinska-Lewandowska at the Centre Georges Pompidou in Paris. In the accompanying catalogue published by the Centre Georges Pompidou and Éditions Xavier Barral, the curators wrote that Henner's work inspired the exhibition:

"C'est probablement Mishka Henner qui a mieux mis en évidence le caractère pléthorique des réponses suscitées par la question <<Qu'est-ce que la photographie?>> En 2010, cet artiste, né en 1976, et qui, depuis près d'une décennie, explore les potentialites créatives de l'Internet, entrait le segment de phrase <<Photography is>> dans un moteur de rechereche afin de recueillir ses multiples occurances sur la toile. Le résultat est un livre d'artiste de 192 pages réunissant plus de trois mille réponses a la question ontologique - sur les trois millions et quelque générées par l'interface [...] Le présent projet s'inspire, a sa manière, du livre de Henner."

''''The surplus of responses elicited by the question "What is photography?" is probably best expressed by Mishka Henner. In 2010, the artist born in 1976 who has spent close to a decade exploring the creative potential of the internet, entered the phrase "Photography is" into a search engine and collected all responses. The result is an artist's book of 192 pages containing more than 3,000 phrases responding to the ontological question [...] In a way, the present project is inspired by Henner's book."

In February 2016, the International Center of Photography in New York announced a site-specific installation of Henner's Photography Is. Spanning nearly 70 feet, text from the book was placed across the construction shed during the building of the ICP's new museum space on the Bowery until its opening in June 2015.  Passers-by were invited to participate in an interactive experience via a live Twitter feed, contributing their own definitions and opinions on what photography is. The museum described Photography Is as "a surprisingly poetic and thought-provoking meditation on how the subject is discussed throughout our culture."

Fifty-One US Military Outposts
In 2010, Henner published Fifty-One US Military Outposts and described it in the following manner: "Overt and covert military outposts used by the United States in fifty-one different countries across the world. Sites located and gathered from information available in the public domain, official US military and veterans' websites and forums, domestic and foreign news articles, and official and leaked government documents and reports." Writing in The Huffington Post in 2014, Peter Yeung wrote: "Henner takes these satellite images and then transforms them by altering and artistically-enhancing the colours, lending them an unexpected, lyrical beauty; without ever altering the specific physical details of images. He explains that projects such as these exploit 'loopholes in the vast archives of data, connecting the dots to reveal things that surround us but which we rarely see.' It is a role reversal, citizens rather than governments doing it, that exposes the ease with which any sort of information can be obtained."

A portfolio of the series was acquired by the New York Public Library in 2013 and was included in the Library's 2014 exhibition Public Eye: 175 Years of Sharing Photography.

Reflecting on the series in the British Journal of Photography, Paul Wombell wrote, "Mishka Henner has used freely available aerial imagery from satellite systems such as Google Earth for many of his projects. For 51 US Military Outposts, he used information available from official US military and veterans’ websites and forums, domestic and foreign news articles, and official and leaked government documents and reports to picture US military bases around the world. These bases are part of the semi-secret locations that mark the present power of the US military. Henner's intention was to depict this world from a military perspective, a world of pure strategy and logistics that controls space from above and below."

Reviewing an installation of Fifty-One US Military Outposts at the Carroll/Fletcher Gallery in London, George Vasey wrote, "We hover over the image, inverting the surveillance-like gaze – the watched become observers. The project shifts the public documentarism articulated by Frank and Lange towards the unseen spaces of private finance and security [...] The ability to navigate and edit data provides new conditions of political accountability in an era of information as capital. Henner’s work recalls Eyal Weizman’s reading of the politics of verticality in relation to the Israel occupation of Palestine. For Weizman, power is structured around a vertical axis by asserting sovereignty over the land (through archeology) and surveillance (by controlling the elevated spaces and skyline). Henner’s images of military sites dramatise this verticality by inviting the spectator to look down at things shot from above."

No Man's Land
In 2011, Henner released No Man’s Land, a collection of photographs apparently showing sex workers around Spain and Italy, as captured by Google's Street View cameras and published as a print-on-demand book.

The work quickly gained notoriety online and featured on numerous blogs and news websites. American journalist and author Violet Blue described the work as haunting “snapshots of the unseen, and yes, the unheard” whilst Pulitzer Prize nominated photojournalist Alan Chin (photographer) described Henner as “a conceptual photographer-artist masturbator.”

Writing in Prison Photography in August 2011, Pete Brook wrote, "for traditionalists, No Man’s Land is a long way from the spirit of documentary photography [...] On Henner’s virtual tour, we cruise, at 50mph. We don’t stop, we don’t get out the car and we don’t get too close. We might as well be in another country … which of course we are [...] Henner’s work allows us to keep a safe distance. He even saves us the trouble of finding these scenes on our own computer screens; we’re detached one step beyond. We are cheap consumers." In a separate post, Jörg Colberg added, “Henner essentially is producing visual statistics, with the women in question being reduced to ciphers, to small, often blurred, shapes that come with a label."

In April 2012, Pete Brook published email correspondence between himself and Henner, in which the artist mounted a defence of his work. “There’s a section of the photo community judging No Man’s Land according to a pretty narrow set of criteria,” wrote Henner. “So narrow they’re avoiding one of the elephants in the room, which is what role is left for the street photographer in the age of Google Street View?”

In 2012, Henner published a second print-on-demand volume of No Man’s Land and was shortlisted for the prestigious Deutsche Börse Photography Prize. Writing about the shortlist for 1000 Words Photography Magazine, Brad Feuerhelm wrote, “No Man’s Land would be a convincingly clever interpretation of lucid geography, technocracy (albeit with lightweight theoretical drive) if I had not seen very similar modes of dissemination before. Not only is it derivative but the project completes a vicious circle of unpleasant attitudes of human currency and a new attempt to denigrate women to that of commerce even further.”

Despite these negative reviews, No Man's Land was shortlisted for the prestigious Deutsche Börse Photography Prize in 2013 and several writers offered more positive insights. Reviewing volume I of No Man’s Land for Source magazine, Daniel Jewsbury wrote:

“I’d argue that Henner’s photographs articulate a very subtle but persuasive challenge to the manner in which we all become ‘resources’ to capital in the contemporary world, what the philosopher Martin Heidegger called a ‘standing reserve’: how, ultimately, we are all merely data to be processed and presented and somehow used. The prostitute, then, is simply presented as an instance of an ‘ideal subject’, as indeed she has been throughout the history of modern capitalism: simultaneously a small entrepreneur who is also her own product, and necessarily a consumer too. No Man’s Land, seen through this lens, is a layer on the map of technological capitalism, a cartography of its reach and its complex interconnections.”

In a lengthy article published in the online journal Circulation Exchange in 2015, Kate Albers reflected that the series “uniquely addresses the uncomfortable collision of public and private space and experience that now characterizes much of our collective lived experience, and wades, too, into the grim realities of the commerce and commodity of physical bodies in the 21st century.”

Less Américains
Henner created further controversy in early 2012 with the publication of Less Américains. In this self-published work, the artist erased much of the content of 83 photographs from Robert Frank's celebrated photobook, The Americans, leaving only occasional remnants of the historic images. In an interview with the New York Times, he describes the erasure of Frank's photobook as an homage to Robert Rauschenberg who similarly created controversy in 1953 with his work Erased de Kooning Drawing. Henner discusses the work in terms of blurring the boundaries of authorship and ownership:

I don’t know if anyone has examined Frank’s images as much as I did ... one of the things that really struck me was playing with shape and texture almost in a way that a painter works. I’m making very active choices about what kind of shape and textures I want to have ...  I started to place my images next to Frank’s and sure enough there were things that you simply wouldn’t have notice before. It suddenly takes on a whole new significance.

The Americans is one of documentary photography's most revered works and Henner's book resulted in mixed reviews. The Guardian's Sean O'Hagan described it as "either inspired or provocative-to-the-point-of-insulting to the original" whilst Colin Pantall, writing in the British Journal of Photography, described it as "a Churchillian proclamation that far from being over, photography has barely begun." A review by Jeffrey Ladd in Time ended by evaluating the work in relation to Jack Kerouac's own words written in the 1958 introduction which accompanied the first US edition of Frank's book:

What poem this is, what poems can be written about this book of pictures some day by some young new writer high by candlelight bending over them describing every grey mysterious detail.

Feedlots
In 2012, Henner began researching oil fields and feedlots in the US, culminating in a cover-feature for the worldwide edition of Vice Magazine's Hopelessness issue in December 2012. In a Los Angeles Times Op-Ed, Henner described how he began working on the series:

"I first came across these feedlots on Google Earth and had no idea what I was seeing. The mass and density of the black and white dots seemed almost microbial. To understand what they were I had to learn about the meat industry and its methods for maximizing yield in the minimum amount of time for the highest profit [...] The meat industry is a subject loaded with a moral and ethical charge. But when I think of these pictures, I don't just see gigantic farms, I see an attitude toward life and death that exists throughout contemporary culture. These images reflect a blueprint and a horror that lie at the heart of the way we live."

Investigative journalist Will Potter described the series as the inspiration behind a successful Kickstarter campaign to use drones to photograph US factory farms from the air, bypassing controversial ag-gag laws in place to prevent, amongst other things, the photographing of factory farms.

Discussing the series for Edible Geography, Nicola Twilley wrote:

"In an era of “ag-gag” laws, in which industrial-scale meat producers have persuaded several compliant state legislatures to make the act of documenting animal facilities with defamatory intent a crime, Earth’s manmade constellation of satellites may yet provide the only documentation of the landscapes that agri-business would rather keep hidden. Redefining the act of photography is not just a philosophical conceit in this instance; it is a necessary progression to continue the photographer’s work of helping us see the world."

In 2014 pictures from Henner's Feedlots and Oil Fields series were shortlisted for the 2014 Prix Pictet.

Publications
Winning Mentality (2010)
Photography Is (2010)
Fifty-One US Military Outposts (2010)
Dutch Landscapes (2011)
Astronomical (2011)
No Man's Land (2011)
No Man's Land II (2012)
Pumped (2012)
Richtered (2012)
Less Américains (2012, 2013)

Awards
2011: Kleine Hans Award
2013: Shortlisted for Deutsche Börse Photography Prize.
2013: Infinity Award, International Center of Photography.
2014: Shortlisted for Prix Pictet.

Exhibitions

Solo exhibitions
2011
 No Man's Land, Hotshoe Gallery, London, UK

2013
 Precious Commodities, Open-Eye Gallery, Liverpool, UK

2014
Black Diamond, Carroll/Fletcher, London

2015
 Semi-Automatic, Bruce Silverstein Gallery, New York

2016
Less Américains, Silverstein/20, New York
 Field, Musée des Beaux Arts, Le Locle, Switzerland

2017
Counter-Intelligence, Örebro Konsthall
Search History, Airspace Gallery, Stoke-on-Trent

2018
Free Fall, Galleria Bianconi, Milan
Remote Possibilities Sune Jonsson Center for Documentary Photography, Västerbottens Museum, Umeå
Seven Seas and a River, Fotografia Europea, Reggio Emilia
Flat Earth Theory, Tosetti Value, Turin

2019
Your Only Chance to Survive is to Leave With Us, Galleria Bianconi, Milan

Selected group exhibitions
2020
 I’m Not the Only One, Fraenkel Gallery, San Francisco
 Potential Worlds: Planetary Memories, Migros Museum für Gegenwartskunst, Zurich
 On Earth: Imaging, Technology and the Natural World, Foam Amsterdam
 The World to Come, DePaul Art Museum, Chicago

2019
 Cámara y Ciudad, Caixaforum, Barcelona
 Contrôle+Z, GwinZegal, Guingamp
 Another West, Fraenkel Gallery, San Francisco
 On Earth, Les Rencontres d’Arles
 Capitalist Realism, Thessaloniki Museum of Photography
 Civilization, Ullens Center for Contemporary Art, Beijing, China

2018
 Civilization, National Museum of Modern and Contemporary Art, Seoul
 The World to Come, Harn Museum of Art, Florida
 Animals & Us, Turner Contemporary, Margate
 Coder le Monde, Centre Pompidou, Paris
 At Altitude, Towner Art Gallery, Eastbourne
 Earth & Sky, Société, Brussels, Belgium
 Watching You Watching Me Bozar, Brussels 
 Surveillance Index Le Bal, Paris

2017
 Green and Pleasant Land Towner Art Gallery, Eastbourne, UK 
 The Cult of the Book Musée des Beaux Arts, Le Locle, Switzerland 
 Les Nouveaux Encyclopédistes Chiostri di San Pietro, Reggio Emilia 
 Watching You Watching Me, Museum für Fotografie, Berlin 
 Britain in Focus: A Photographic History, National Media Museum, Bradford

2016
 Watched! Kunsthal Aarhus, Denmark
 The Edge of the Earth, Ryerson Image Center, Toronto
 Was ist fotografie heute? Pinakothek, Munich
 Yo quería ser fotógrafo, Fundació Foto Colectania, Barcelona
 Aerial Imagery in Print, 1860 to Today, MoMA, New York
 Ed Ruscha Books & Co Gagosian Gallery, Beverly Hills, California
 WATCHED! Surveillance Art and Photography in Europe After Nine-Eleven, Hasselblad Center, Göteborg
 Touch the Sky: Art and Astronomy, Frances Lehman Loeb Art Center, Vassar College, New York
 Safe and Sound, MUDAC, Lausanne, Switzerland
 Cornucopia, Shepparton Art Museum, Australia

2015
 Infosphere ZKM | Zentrum für Kunst und Medientechnologie, Karlsruhe
 Ocean of Images: New Photography 2015, MoMA, New York
 Public Eye New York Public Library, New York
 A History of Photography: Series and Sequences, V&A, London
 Une histoire, art, architecture et design, des années 80 à aujourd'hui, Centre Pompidou, Paris
 No Man Nature Fotografia Europea, Palazzo Mosto, Reggio Emilia
 Beyond Evidence, QUAD, Derby, UK
 Modern History vol. 1, Grundy Art Gallery, Blackpool, UK
 This Is War! Palazzo del Monte di Pietà, Italy
 Digital Conditions, Kunstverein Hannover, Germany
 Ed Ruscha: Books & Co., Gagosian, Paris
 Watching You Watching Me, Open Society Foundation, NYC
 Consumption, Museo Nacional de Arte, Mexico City
 Eighteen Pumpjacks, The Armory Show, New York
 The Hierarchy of Images, Galleria Foto Forum, Italy

2014
 ABCEUM, University of Brighton Gallery, UK
 Zelf weten, Galerie Ron Mandos, Amsterdam
 Consumption, Fondazione Sandretto Re Rebaudengo, Turin
 Images Vevey, Switzerland
 MANIFESTOS! Eine Andere Geschichte der Fotografie Fotomuseum Winterthur, Switzerland
 Consumption, Westbau, Zurich
 Consumption, Bernheimer Fine Art Photography, Munich
 Object Recognition, Sale Waterside
 (Mis)Understanding Photography: Works & Manifestos, Museum Folkwang, Essen
 They Used to Call it the Moon, Baltic [Link]
 Consumption: Prix Pictet 2014, Victoria & Albert Museum, London
 Now You See It: Photography and Concealment Metropolitan Museum of Art, New York 
 In Context: The Portrait in Contemporary Photographic Practice Wellin Museum of Art

2013
 Drone: The Automated Image, Darling Foundry, Montreal, Canada
 Plotting from Above, McCord Museum, Montreal Canada
 Precious Commodities, Open Eye Gallery, Liverpool, UK
 Views From Above, Centre Pompidou-Metz, France
 A Different Kind of Order, International Center of Photography, New York
 Deutsche Börse Photography Prize 2013, The Photographers' Gallery, London

2012
 Photographers, Berwick Film and Media Arts Festival
 The Big Picture, Ars Electronica, Linz, Austria
 Work, Festival Internazionale di Roma, Museum of Contemporary Art, Rome, Italy
 Dutch Landscapes, Journées photographiques de Bienne, Switzerland
 David Horvitz's Bouquet, Border Gallery, Mexico City, Mexico, 2012. Organised by David Horvitz. Includes Anjum Asharia and Marisa Jahn, BFFA3AE, Claudia Sola, David Horvitz, Hans Aarsman, Jon Rafman, Kristina Lee Podesva, Marysia Lewandowska, Michael Mandiberg, Mishka Henner, Natalie Häusler and Vlatka Horvat.
 Live Stream, MediaCityUK, UK
 Appropriation: Questioning the Image, Fotogalerie Wien, Austria
 No Man's Land, Oregon Center for Photographic Arts, USA
 From Here On, FotoMuseum Antwerp, Belgium
 Let Us Keep Our Own Noon, Galerie West, Hague, Netherlands

2011
 No Man's Land, HotShoe Gallery, London, 2011
 From Here On, Rencontres d'Arles, France, 2011
 Dark Matter, Mews Project Space, London, 2011
 ABC Artists’ Books Cooperative, Printed Matter, New York, 2011
 Collateral Damage group exhibition, Look 11, Liverpool and International Festival of Journalism, Perugia, 2011. Curated by Paul Lowe and Harry Hardie. Included photographs from 51 US Bases as well as images by Lisa Barnard, Simon Norfolk, Tim Hetherington, Ziyah Gafić, Paul Lowe, Edmund Clark, Ashley Gilbertson, Brett Van Ort, Adam Broomberg and Olivier Chanarin.
 Political Absurd, Art & Culture Laboratory, Krk, Croatia, 2011
 Follow-Ed (after Hokusai), P74 Gallery, Ljubljana, Slovenia & Arnolfini, Bristol, 2011

Public collections
Henner's work is held in the following public collections:
 Tate Gallery, London.
 Centre Georges Pompidou, Paris.
 Baltic Centre for Contemporary Art.
 National Art Library, Victoria and Albert Museum.
 Glasgow School of Art Library.
 Vassar College Library, New York.
 Cleveland Museum of Art, Cleveland, OH.
 Portland Art Museum, Portland, OR.
 Museum of Fine Arts, Houston, TX.

References

External links
 
 ABC Artists' Books Cooperative

1976 births
Living people
Photographers from Brussels
Photographers from Manchester